Weighted round robin (WRR) is a network scheduler for data flows, but also used to schedule processes.

Weighted round robin is a generalisation of round-robin scheduling. It serves a set of queues or tasks. Whereas round-robin cycles over the queues or tasks and gives one service opportunity per cycle, weighted round robin offers to each a fixed number of opportunities, as specified by the configured weight which serves to influence the portion of capacity received by each queue or task. In computer networks, a service opportunity is the emission of one packet, if the selected queue is non-empty.

If all packets have the same size, WRR is the simplest approximation of generalized processor sharing (GPS). Several variations of WRR exist. The main ones are the classical WRR, and the interleaved WRR.

Algorithm

Principles 

WRR is presented in the following as a network scheduler. It can also be used to schedule tasks in a similar way.

A weighted round-robin network scheduler has  input queues, . To each queue  is associated , a positive integer, called the weight. The WRR scheduler has a cyclic behavior. In each cycle, each queue   has  emissions opportunities.

The different WRR algorithms differ on the distributions of these opportunities in the cycle.

Classical WRR 

In classical WRR
the scheduler cycles over the queues. When a queue  is selected, the scheduler will send packets, up to the emission of  packet or the end of queue.

Interleaved WRR 

Let , be the maximum weight. In IWRR, each cycle is split into  rounds. A queue with weight  can emit one packet at round  only if .

Example 

Consider a system with three queues  and respective weights . Consider a situation where they are 7 packets in the first queue, A,B,C,D,E,F,G, 3 in the second queue, U,V,W and 2 in the third queue X,Y. Assume that there is no more packet arrival.

With interleaved WRR, the first cycle is split into 5 rounds (since ). Then starts the second cycle, where F,W,G are sent.

Task scheduling

Task or process scheduling can be done in WRR in a way similar to packet scheduling: when considering a set of  active tasks, they are scheduled in a cyclic way, each task  gets  quantum or slice of processor time
.

Properties

Like round-robin, weighted round robin scheduling is simple, easy to implement, work conserving and starvation-free.

If the queues have packets of variable length, the part of the bandwidth received by each queue depends not only on the weights but also of the packets sizes.

If the objective is to give to each queue  a portion  of link capacity (with ), one may set  .

Since IWRR has smaller per class bursts than WRR, it implies smaller worst-case delays.

Limitations and improvements 
WRR for network packet scheduling was first proposed by Katevenis, Sidiropoulos and Courcoubetis in 1991, specifically for scheduling in ATM networks using fixed-size packets (cells). The primary limitation of weighted round-robin queuing is that it provides the correct percentage of bandwidth to each service class only if all the packets in all the queues are the same size or when the mean packet size is known in advance. In the more general case of IP networks with variable size packets, to approximate GPS the weight factors must be adjusted based on the packet size. That requires estimation of the average packet size, which makes a good GPS approximation hard to achieve in practice with WRR.

Deficit round robin is a later variation of WRR that achieves better GPS approximation without knowing the mean packet size of each connection in advance. More effective scheduling disciplines were also introduced which handle the limitations mentioned above (e.g. weighted fair queuing).

See also

 Fair queuing
 Fairness measure
 Processor sharing
 Statistical time-division multiplexing

References

Network scheduling algorithms